Soul Solution is a house/electronic dance music production duo from New York City formed by Bobby Guy and Ernie Lake.

Biography
As artists they made six appearances on the Billboard Hot Dance Music/Club Play chart.

Five times under the Soul Solution name:
(1994) "Love, Peace & Happiness" (#29)
(1996) "Find a Way" (#4)
(1996) "Can't Stop Love" (#3)
(1999) "Let It Rain" (featuring Carolyn Harding) (#2)
(2000) "All Around the World" (featuring Carolyn Harding) (#4)

Once under the name So Pure! featuring Sheleen Thomas:
(1999) "Changes" (#1)

See also
List of number-one dance hits (United States)
List of artists who reached number one on the US Dance chart

References

American house music duos
American dance music groups
Electronic music groups from New York (state)